Thomas S. Steers (1804 – June 13, 1884) was an American law enforcement officer and police captain of the New York City Police Department during the mid-to late 19th century. He was one of the earliest police officials appointed to the Metropolitan police force serving for over twenty years until his retirement in 1870. Steers also played a prominent role in the Draft Riot of 1863. He was the father of Captain Henry V. Steers, longtime precinct captain of the Twenty-Fifth Precinct located at New York City Hall.

Biography
Thomas S. Steers was born in New York City, New York, in 1804. He was educated in public schools and entered the police force in 1848. Working his way up the ranks, he eventually became a police captain in 1857 and was assigned to head the Thirteenth Precinct where he remained for several years.

In the early hours of the Draft Riot of 1863, Steers was one of several senior officers to lead groups to confront rioters. That afternoon at about 1:00 pm, he and a small police squad made a desperate stand at 35th Street to try to halt the mob but were overwhelmed by the rioters' far larger numbers and his men fled in disorder.

Steers spent his later career being transferred to several other precincts, reportedly "always doing good wherever he was", before finally retiring from active service in 1870. He lived with his family during his last years and died at the home of his daughter in Brooklyn on the morning of June 13, 1884. His funeral was held almost a week later.

References

Further reading
Barnes, David M. The Draft Riots in New York, July, 1863: The Metropolitan Police, Their Services During Riot Week, Their Honorable Record. New York: Baker & Godwin, 1863.
Costello, Augustine E. Our Police Protectors: History of the New York Police from the Earliest Period to the Present Time. New York: A.E. Costello, 1885.
Hickey, John J. Our Police Guardians: History of the Police Department of the City of New York, and the Policing of Same for the Past One Hundred Years. New York: John J. Hickey, 1925.
McCague, James. The Second Rebellion: The Story of the New York City Draft Riots of 1863. New York: Dial Press, 1968.

1804 births
1884 deaths
New York City Police Department officers
People from New York City